The 2012–13 CBA season was the 18th CBA season. This season began on November 24, 2012.

Foreign players policy
All teams except Bayi Rockets can have two foreign players, while the bottom 5 teams of last season have an extra right to sign an Asian player. The rule of using players in each game is described in this chart:

+ Including players from Hong Kong and Chinese Taipei.

++ If teams waive their rights to sign the extra Asian player, they may use foreign players for 7 quarters collectively.

+++ Only 1 allowed in the 4th quarter.

Regular Season Standings

Statistics Leaders

Individual Statistic Leaders

Playoffs bracket

Awards

Players of the week

The following players were named the Domestic and Foreign Players of the Week.

References

External links
Official Website 
163 CBA Coverage
CBA China - 2012-13 Standings and Stats on Basketball-Reference.com

      
League
Chinese Basketball Association seasons
CBA